Unión Deportiva Los Llanos de Aridane is a football team based in Los Llanos de Aridane, in the Canary Islands. Founded in 1996, it plays in Tercera División – Group 12. Its stadium is Estadio Aceró with a capacity of 2,000 seats.

History
UD Los Llanos was founded in 1996 following a merger of CD Argual, SD Velia and UD Aridane. The team played in regional divisions until 2008 when debuting in Tercera División (2008–09 season).

Season to season

2 season in Tercera División

External links
Unofficial blog

Football clubs in the Canary Islands
Sport in La Palma
Association football clubs established in 1996
Divisiones Regionales de Fútbol clubs
1996 establishments in Spain